John Peek is an Australian former professional rugby league footballer who played in the 1970s and 1980s.  He played for Canterbury-Bankstown and South Sydney as a lock.

Playing career
A Lakemba United junior, Peek made his debut for Canterbury-Bankstown (first grade player number #386) in 1972 against Balmain.  In 1974, Peek played for Canterbury in the 1974 grand final defeat against Eastern Suburbs.  The following year, Peek captained Canterbury for a few games but by 1976 was demoted to reserve grade.  In 1978, Peek joined South Sydney (first grade player number #639) and spent four seasons at the club before retiring at the end of 1981.  Peek is the father of former rugby league journeyman Adam Peek.

References

South Sydney Rabbitohs players
Canterbury-Bankstown Bulldogs players
Rugby league players from Sydney
Rugby league locks
1956 births
Living people
South Sydney Rabbitohs captains